First United Methodist Church is a historic Methodist church at 101 N. 2nd Street in West Monroe, Louisiana.  It was added to the National Register in 2001.

Its main block is a Colonial Revival-style two-and-one-half story masonry church erected in 1920.  A two-story education wing was added between 1945 and 1950.

It was deemed notable "as a rare and monumental example of the Colonial Revival style."

References

United Methodist churches in Louisiana
Churches on the National Register of Historic Places in Louisiana
Colonial Revival architecture in Louisiana
Churches completed in 1920
Churches in Ouachita Parish, Louisiana
National Register of Historic Places in Ouachita Parish, Louisiana